Ilva may refer to:

 ILVA, a Danish chain of furniture stores
 Ilva (company), an Italian steelworks company
 Ilva (Mureș), a river in Mureș County, Romania
 Ilva (planthopper) in the Achilidae
 Ilva (Someș), a river in Bistrița-Năsăud County, Romania
 Ilva Mică, a commune in Bistrița-Năsăud County, Romania
 Ilva Mare, a commune in Bistrița-Năsăud County, Romania